Canadian Mounties vs Atomic Invaders (1953) is a Republic Movie serial starring Bill Henry and both produced and directed by Franklin Adreon.  It was the sixty-second serial (of sixty-six) produced by Republic.  Despite the title, this is not a science fiction serial.  The plot is a northern cold war adventure involving secret missile bases and a planned invasion of the United States.

Plot

A foreign power, which is represented by their agent Marlof, attempts to set up secret missile bases in Canada to target the United States for their planned summer invasion. Meanwhile, acting on intelligence following the smashing of a spy ring in Montreal, Royal Canadian Mounted Police (RCMP) officers Don Roberts and Kay Conway go undercover in a settling party headed for the Yukon.  Marlof also has agents, Beck and Reed, in the party en route to the site of the planned missile bases.  Their attempts to disrupt the party only call the attention of the Mounties to the larger plot who, once the settlers finally reach their goal, continue to pursue the troublemakers, uncover their plot against the free world, unmask Marlof and bring them to justice.

Cast
Bill Henry as Don Roberts, Sergeant in the RCMP
Susan Morrow as Kay Conway, undercover operative of the RCMP
Arthur Space as Marlof, agent of a foreign power masquerading as Smoky Joe, a senile trapper
Dale Van Sickel as Beck, one of Marlof's two key henchmen.
Pierre Watkin as Morrison, Commissioner of the RCMP

Supporting cast
Mike Ragan as Reed, the other of Marlof's two key henchmen.
Stanley Andrews as Anderson, lead headed for the Yukon
Edmund Cobb as Warner, a settler headed for the Yukon
Jean Wright as Betty Warner, a settler headed for the Yukon
Fred Graham as Mason, a henchman embedded with the settlers to keep them from reaching the Yukon
Hank Patterson as Jed Larson, a wizened Yukon trapper
Gayle Kellogg as Guy Sanders, a Corporal in the RCMP
Harry Lauter as Clark, a Mountie
Tom Steele as Mac, Marlof's truck driving henchman

Production
Canadian Mounties vs. Atomic Invaders was budgeted at $172,795 although the final negative cost was $167,669 (a $5,126, or 3%, under spend).  It was the cheapest Republic serial of 1953 and the most under budget of all Republic serials.

The next most under budget was the preceding Jungle Drums of Africa at $5,082 (2.9%) under budget.  Those were the only two Republic serials released in 1953, although the studio did re-release Adventures of Captain Marvel (as Return of Captain Marvel) and Captain America (as Return of Captain America) to pad out their release schedule, not to mention the serial Commando Cody: Sky Marshal of the Universe, which was originally intended to be a television series.

Though filmed entirely in the United States, early chapters in Canadian Mounties vs. Atomic Invaders are set in a snowy region of northern Canada referred to as Taniak and rely heavily on the use of footage from earlier Republic productions including the 1938 feature Call of the Yukon and serials King of the Royal Mounted and King of the Mounties. These are blended with rear projection scenes featuring the serial's cast on studio sets and a "snow-dressed" Republic backlot. Later chapters set in snow-free forest were largely filmed in the Big Bear Lake region of California's San Bernardino National Forest.

It was filmed between 24 March and 13 April 1953.  The serial's production number was 1936.

Stunts
 George DeNormand
 Fred Graham
 Carey Loftin
 Dale Van Sickel
 Joe Yrigoyen

Special effects
Special Effects by the Lydecker brothers

Release

Theatrical
Canadian Mounties vs. Atomic Invaders official release date is 8 July 1953, although this is actually the date the sixth chapter was made available to film exchanges.

This was followed by a re-release of Captain America, re-titled as Return of Captain America, instead of a new serial.  The next new serial, Trader Tom of the China Seas, followed in 1954.

Television
Canadian Mounties vs. Atomic Invaders was one of twenty-six Republic serials re-released as a 100-minute "Century 66" feature film on television in 1966, titled Missile Base at Taniak.

Chapter titles
Arctic Intrigue (20 min 00s)
Murder or Accident? (13 min 20s)
Fangs of Death (13 min 20s)
Underground Inferno (13 min 20s)
Pursuit to Destruction (13 min 20s)
The Boat Trap (13 min 20s)
Flame Versus Gun (13 min 20s)
Highway of Horror (13 min 20s)
Doomed Cargo (13 min 20s)
Human Quarry (13 min 20s) -- Re-cap Chapter
Mechanical Homicide (13 min 20s)
Cavern of Revenge (13 min 20s)
Source:

Cliffhangers

Cliffhangers

Arctic Intrigue: Beck buries Don and Kay in an avalanche.
Murder or Accident?: Don is lured into a trap and falls down a concealed mineshaft.
Fangs of Death: Beck knocks Don unconscious and commands his lead sled dog to kill.
Underground Inferno: Don is caught in a cave full of burning ammunition as it explodes.
Pursuit to Destruction: In a car chase, Don's tire is punctured sending it over a cliff.
The Boat Trap: While intercepting a boat, the Mounties come under grenade attack from Beck.
Flame Versus Gun: Beck shoots Don with a rifle, knocking the Mountie over a cliff.
Highway of Horror: Kay is knocked unconscious in a car, which crashes and explodes.
Doomed Cargo: Don knocks Beck and Reed overboard but the boat he's on crashes into the rocks.
Human Quarry: Don is caught in a bear trap and triggers a spiked deadfall trap as he tries to escape.
Mechanical Homicide: Marlof rolls his car into the rock Don is using for cover, sending everything over a cliff.

Solutions

Murder or Accident?: Don and Kay survive the avalanche.
Fangs of Death: Don grabs a root as he falls and climbs back out.
Underground Inferno: Kay disperses the pack of dogs with gunshots (Don's thick coat protected him from a mauling).
Pursuit to Destruction: Don runs out of the cave just in time.
The Boat Trap: Don jumps clear of the car before it goes over the edge.
Flame Versus Gun: The Mounties jump overboard before their boat explodes.
Highway of Horror: Don lands in a river.  His cartridge case caught the bullet.
Doomed Cargo: Don rides alongside and rescues Kay.
Human Quarry: Don dives overboard before the boat crashes.
Mechanical Homicide: Don jams the falling trap with a piece of firewood and Kay frees him from the bear trap.
Cavern of Revenge : Don dives safely into a river below.

References

External links

Brief review of Canadian Mounties vs Atomic Invaders at Quirk's Reviews

1953 films
1950s spy films
1950s English-language films
American spy films
Northern (genre) films
American black-and-white films
Republic Pictures film serials
Royal Canadian Mounted Police in fiction
Cold War history of Canada
Films set in Yukon
Films directed by Franklin Adreon
1950s American films